Transports Metropolitans de Barcelona (TMB) is the main public transit operator in Barcelona. A combination of two formerly-separate companies, Ferrocarril Metropolità de Barcelona, SA. and Transports de Barcelona, SA., it runs most of the metro and local bus lines in Barcelona and the metropolitan area.

The bus network serves Barcelona and the metropolitan area through 109 lines that cover a total distance of 920.62 kilometres. The Barcelona Metro network has 123 stations. It is formed by six lines and a funicular railway. In 2016, TMB carried 578.75 million passengers and had 7,744 employees.

There is also an authority in Barcelona that seeks to coordinate and integrate other public transport companies (such as TRAMMET, for the local trams) into the same network, Autoritat del Transport Metropolità.

Logo history
TMB changed its logo in 2014 after introducing a stencil-style variant of Helvetica for their publicity.

See also
 Autoritat del Transport Metropolità
 Barcelona Metro
 List of Barcelona Metro stations
 Ferrocarrils de la Generalitat de Catalunya
 Rodalies de Catalunya
 TRAMMET
 Transport in Barcelona

References

External links
 
 Autoritat del Transport Metropolità
 Mobilitat - Àrea Metropolitana de Barcelona

Transport operators in Barcelona
Companies based in Barcelona
Barcelona Metro
Bus transport in Spain
2004 establishments in Catalonia